Srinivas Avasarala (born 19 March 1984) is an Indian actor, film director, screenwriter, and television presenter known for his works in Telugu cinema. He received two Nandi Awards and a SIIMA Award.

Early life
Srinivas Avasarala was born on 19 March 1984 in Kakinada, Andhra Pradesh, India. His father worked at Andhra Bank. By virtue of his work, they had to travel across different locations. Hence, Avasarala completed his education in 4 cities – Kakinada, Vijayawada, Hyderabad, and Visakhapatnam. He did his B.Tech. in Mechanical Engineering from KL College of Engineering, Vijayawada. Avasarala holds a Masters in Mechanical Engineering with focus on Finite Element Analysis from University of North Dakota and worked for Princeton Plasma Physics Laboratory.

Career 
Avasarala holds a screenwriting diploma from University of California, Los Angeles and took acting classes for a year at Lee Strasberg Theatre and Film Institute, New York City. He did theatre in New York and then worked as an assistant director for a film called Blind Ambition. He also hosted one of the quiz shows, Champion which aired on ETV Telugu for the first season.

He made his acting debut with the film Ashta Chamma- an adaptation of Oscar Wilde's The Importance of Being Earnest. His portrayal of Anand, Algernon in the play, received wide critical acclaim.  He made his directorial debut with the Telugu romantic-comedy, Oohalu Gusagusalade (2014). He also essayed the role of Uday Bhaskar in the film which earned him South Indian International Movie Award for Best Supporting Actor. He has essayed character actor roles in works such as Pilla Zamindar, Anthakamundhu Aatharvaatha, and Kanche which won the National Film Award for Best Feature Film in Telugu for that year.

Filmography

Films

As Actor

As director or writer

Television

Awards and nominations
South Indian International Movie Awards
 Best Supporting Actor (Telugu) – Oohalu Gusagusalade (2014) – won

Nandi Awards
 Special Jury Award – Oohalu Gusagusalade (2014) – won
 Best Dialogue Writer – Jyo achyutananda (2016) – won

References

External links
 

Living people
Indian male film actors
Male actors in Telugu cinema
Telugu comedians
Telugu screenwriters
Telugu film directors
Telugu-language lyricists
21st-century Indian film directors
21st-century Indian dramatists and playwrights
Indian male dramatists and playwrights
Telugu-language dramatists and playwrights
Indian male comedians
Male actors from Hyderabad, India
Telugu male actors
UCLA Film School alumni
Lee Strasberg Theatre and Film Institute alumni
Indian emigrants to the United States
Andhra University alumni
21st-century Indian male actors
21st-century Indian male writers
1984 births
21st-century Indian screenwriters
South Indian International Movie Awards winners
Screenwriters from Andhra Pradesh
Film directors from Andhra Pradesh
Male actors from Andhra Pradesh
People from Kakinada